Gary Pig Gold (born May 30, 1955 in Toronto, Ontario) is a Canadian singer-songwriter, record producer, filmmaker, author and journalist. His fanzine The Pig Paper was Canada's second independently published music magazine, and among the recording artists he has worked with are Pat Boone, Dave Rave, Endless Summer, Simply Saucer and Shane Faubert. Gold has written many books on popular music and has contributed to dozens of magazines as well as seven books in the multi-genre MusicHound album guide series. AllMusic describes him as "rock music's all-time hardest-working man ... with all apologies to James Brown".

Early career
He formed his first band, Pornographic Cornflake (named after "I Am the Walrus" lyric) at age thirteen, and his first 16mm film made four years later, a documentary about his hometown entitled This is Port Credit!, was chosen to be aired on a local PBS Television affiliate after winning an award at a high school film competition. Due to its libelous nature however, Gold was advised to indemnify himself from possible legal action by crediting the film to a fictitious director. Eating breakfast the morning the credits were to be re-shot, a plastic pig stamper fell from his cereal box and the pseudonym Gary Pig was adopted.

Writing and publishing
Under this nom de plume, Gold began self-publishing the fanzine The Pig Paper in 1973 and distributing it by mail to friends. Visiting London two years later he met Joe Strummer, then leading The 101ers, who encouraged Gold to continue his writing. That winter, he published a mock concert program commemorating an appearance by The Who in Toronto, and in 1977 a similar Pig Paper on The Kinks became the first issue to be made available outside of Canada, when Gold followed the band to a concert and record signing in Buffalo, New York.

The featured interviewee of that Pig Paper was Edgar Breau, whose band Simply Saucer Gold began managing and producing, releasing their first record June 8, 1978 on Pig Records. It was voted Single Of The Week in London's Record Mirror the following month. By then, The Pig Paper was being distributed throughout the U.S. and Europe, offering early in-depth coverage of The Viletones, Ramones, Half Japanese, Elvis Costello and Talking Heads as well as features on such vintage acts as The Hollies and Dave Clark Five.

The Pig Paper has become an important primary source for the documentation of the Toronto punk scene with citations in numerous published works and histories of the punk movement.

Gold is a noted interviewer and music writer, writing for music publications and fanzines like Ear Candy Mag, Indie Journal, and purrmag.

Gold is a writer and contribute to numerous music publications, authoring Visible Ink Press's Music Hound Essential Album Guide series, as well as Bubblegum Music Is the Naked Truth, Encounters With Bob Dylan, Lost in the Grooves, Paul McCartney: I Saw Him Standing There, TV A-Go-Go, Treat Me Like Dirt: An Oral History of Punk in Toronto and Beyond 1977–1981, and  The Little Black Book of Music. He is a contributor on publications such as Lost in the Grooves: Scram's Capricious Guide to the Music You Missed published by Routledge.

His syndicated "Pigshit" column continues to run monthly online, having first appeared in Los Angeles' Flipside (fanzine) in 1979.

He was also a featured interview subject in the Jandek on Corwood documentary film.

Music activities
Immediately after attending a Jan and Dean concert in Toronto during the summer of 1980, Gold relocated to California where he formed The Loved Ones, as well as promoting concerts for local bands such as The Crowd over the next three years. He spent the remainder of the decade back in Canada, first joining the Vancouver-based Fun With Numbers band before touring five years with Endless Summer. In 1989, he returned to the studio, working in Nashville alongside Donald Dunn and Pat Boone, then at Daniel Lanois’ Grant Avenue Studio with Dave Rave DesRoches, the latter sessions resulting in the Valentino's Pirates album, which became the first independently recorded western release to be issued on the Soviet Union's Melodiya record label.

After relocating to New York City with DesRoches to form the Dave Rave Conspiracy alongside Billy Ficca of Television and ex-Washington Squares Lauren Agnelli, Gold co-founded the pioneering alternative-country band The Ghost Rockets, whose  maximum rhythm ‘n’ bluegrass cover of the Beach Boys' "In My Room" became a radio "turntable hit" in Europe. Another song, "Marcia Marcia Marcia", written by Gold for the A Very Brady Sequel movie, appeared instead on the King Records label in New Zealand, to be followed by dozens of other Ghost Rockets releases worldwide.

Activities as a producer
Gold meanwhile produced two albums for Shane Faubert, formerly of The Cheepskates, at Dubway Studios. With Shane, he began the To M’Lou Music label in 1998, releasing the acclaimed debut album of the Los Angeles band The Masticators as well as He's a Rebel: The Gene Pitney Story Retold, which included exclusive recordings by Billy Cowsill, Mick Farren, Gordon Waller and Al Kooper. Gold contributed tracks himself to the Bullseye Records of Canada Men In Plaid Bay City Rollers tribute album as well as singing alongside Jim Carroll for Back to The Streets: Celebrating the Music of Don Covay, and with Andrew Loog Oldham on the 1993 issue of Alex Chilton's Bach's Bottom album.

Later career
In 2008, Gold began work at John Huelbig's Backroom Studios in Wallington, New Jersey, writing, performing and producing with such artists as Mark Johnson, Chris Butler, Dave Rave and Frank Lee Sprague.

Discography
 Gary Pig Gold, 1998
 "Permanent Vacation" / "Rock and Roll Love Letter," 2000
 Gary Goes To Hollywood!, 2002

Production Credits
 "She's A Dog" / "I Can Change My Mind" – Simply Saucer, 1978, 2018
 Valentino's Pirates – Dave Rave Conspiracy (aka Dave Rave Group), 1990, 2001, 2019
 San Blass – Shane Faubert, 1993
 Three Octave Fantastic Hexagram – Dave Rave Conspiracy, 1994
 Squirrelboy Blue – Shane Faubert, 1997
 Unsound, Volume Two: Guitars! – various artists, 1999
 Homework # 2: U.S. D.I.Y.- Punk and Punkwave Singles R to U – Simply Saucer, 2000
 Driving In The Rain 3AM: Songs to Get Lost With – Dave Rave Group, 2002
 He's A Rebel: The Gene Pitney Story Retold – various artists, 2002
 Cyborgs Revisited – Simply Saucer, 2003

Appears on
 "Johnny Kool" / "Wouldn't It Be Nice" – Endless Summer, 1986
 "That Summer Feeling" / "Wouldn't It Be Nice" – Endless Summer, 1988
 "Fools’ Hall Of Fame" – Pat Boone, 1989
 Kalkara – Shane Faubert, 1990
 Amazing Grace – The Wretches, 1990
 A One Act Play With V-8 Engines – Dave Rave Conspiracy, 1992
 Bach's Bottom – Alex Chilton, 1993
 "Christmas" / "Steeplechase" – The Rooks, 1993
 Cowboy Flowers Sessions – Agnelli and Rave, 1995
 "Roses To You" / "Marcia Marcia Marcia" – The Ghost Rockets, 1996
 "Weight Of The World" / "Do It All Over" – Dave Rave Conspiracy, 1996
 Confetti! – Agnelli and Rave, 1997
 Bootlegs – The Ghost Rockets, 1998
 Spatula Ranch Sessions, Volume One – The Ghost Rockets, 1998
 Encore Echoes – The Rooks, 2000
 D. T. Delinquent – Jack Pedler, 2003
 Lost and Found – Jeremy (Morris), 2004
 Anthology, Vol.s 1 and 2 – Dave Rave, 2006
 Modern Silence – Casper & The Cookies, 2009
 NBT-4-CNP – The Next Big Thing, 2009
 Live With What You Know – Dave Rave, 2010
 Complete Masticators! – The Masticators, 2013
 Best – Mick Hargreaves, 2013
 A Little Messed Up In Rock & Roll – Dave Rave, 2017

Compilation albums
 Baloney Sandwich – The Loved Ones, The Know Goods, 1990
 1990 Volume 5 – Dave Rave Group, 1991
 22 Original Hits, 22 Original Stars – Dave Rave Conspiracy, Lauren Agnelli, 1991
 U.S. Rock ‘n’ Roll Anthology Volume 1 – Dave Rave, 1991
 The 8th Wonder – Martin and the E-Chords, 1991
 More Hits, More Stars – Dave Rave Conspiracy, Coyote Shivers, 1992
 Reaction, Volume One – Dave Rave Conspiracy, 1992
 Rock My Child – Lauren Agnelli, 1993
 Back To The Streets: Celebrating The Music of Don Covay, 1993
 Impact Music, Volume 2 – Dave Rave Conspiracy, 1994
 Powerplay – The Ghost Rockets, 1995
 Total Fun – The Ghost Rockets, 1996
 Hit The Hay, Volume 2 – The Ghost Rockets, 1996
 Never Been To Nashville – The Ghost Rockets, 1996
 Astral Weeks – The Ghost Rockets, 1996
 Pop! Productions 1987-1997 – The Ghost Rockets, 1997
 A Pig Pop Sampler – The Ghost Rockets, Shane Faubert, 1997
 Edges From The Postcard – The Ghost Rockets, 1997
 Fireworks – The Ghost Rockets, 1997
 Twangfest 1997 – The Ghost Rockets, 1997
 The Ghost Rockets, Astral Weeks – The Ghost Rockets, 1997
 Unsound, Volume One: Pop! – Gary and the Portastudio, 1998
 Edges From The Postcard 2 – The Ghost Rockets, 1998
 Essentials – The Ghost Rockets, 1999
 This Note's For You Too! A Tribute to Neil Young – Shane Faubert, 1999
 Postcards From The Other Side – The Ghost Rockets, 1999
 A Tribute to The Left Banke: Shadows Breaking Over Our Heads – Shane Faubert, 1999
 Men In Plaid: A Tribute to The Bay City Rollers – Gary and the Grip Weeds, 2000
 Full Circle: A Tribute to Gene Clark – The Ghost Rockets, 2000
 Burnt Marshmallows and Teeny Bikinis – Gary and the Masticators, 2000
 International Pop Overthrow Vol. 3 – Shane Faubert, 2000
 Shoe Fetish: A Tribute to Shoes – Shane Faubert, 2001
 Dropped On The Head, Volume 1 – Gary Pig Gold, 2001
 Uno-A-Go-Go! – Gary Pig Gold, 2002
 Under the Covers at Hawthorne High Vol. 9 – The Ghost Rockets, 2004
 This is Rock ‘n’ Roll Radio, Volume 1 – Gary Pig Gold and Shane Faubert, 2005
 The Blog Gems, Volume Three (1976-1999) – Gary and the Masticators, 2006
 Hi-Fi Christmas Party Volume 2 – Gary Pig Gold, 2006
 Sweet Relief – The Next Big Thing, Ghost Rockets, Dave Rave Group, 2007
 ValleyView Christmas Compilation 2007 – Gary Pig Gold, 2007
 Tributes Or Not Tributes – Gary and the Grip Weeds, 2008
 Raiders Of The Lost Hook Vol. 2 – Dave Rave Group, 2008
 The Mockeers: Then and Now – Gary Pig Gold and his Loved Ones, 2008
 ValleyView Christmas Compilation 2008 – Gary Gold and his Orchestra, 2008
 That's Truckdrivin''' – Gary Pig Gold, 2009
 Winter Holidays with Little Pocket – Gary Pig Gold, 2009
 Not Quite Yet (Wives Alive @5) – The Faubert Gold, 2010
 International Email Audio Art Project Volume 2 – Gary Pig Gold, 2010
 Mongrel Zine Volume Nine CD Comp – Gary Pig Gold, 2010
 What We Do On Our Holidays – Gary Pig Gold, 2010
 Best Of Mongrel Zine #1-3 Compilation – Gary Pig Gold, 2011
 Pop Garden Radio Presents: The Rock On The Road Tour, Season 2 – The Next Big Thing, 2011
 Legacy: A Tribute To Rick Nelson, Volume 1 – Gary Pig Gold, 2013
 Get Yer Fa La La's Out: A Bullseye Christmas Vol. III – Gary Pig Gold, 2013
 It Was 50 Years Ago Today: A Tribute to The Beatles, Volume 2 – Little Sisters, 2014
 Heavy Metalloid Music – The Loved Ones, 2016

Liner Notes
 More Hits, More Stars – Rick Harper, Mark William Johnson, 1992
 Astral Weeks – The Ghost Rockets, 1996
 Unsound, Volume One: Pop!, 1998
 Unsound, Volume Two: Guitars!, 1999
 Burnt Marshmallows and Teeny Bikinis, 2000
 232 Days On The Road – Adam Marsland, 2002
 Cyborgs Revisited – Simply Saucer, 2003
 Mad Kingdom – Robin Stanley, 2004
 Magic City Music: Ft. Lauderdale 1981-1986 – Breathers, 2004
 Lost And Found – Jeremy (Morris), 2004
 Remember – The Cheepskates, 2004
 Jam On Jeremy: A Tribute To Jeremy Morris, 2005
 Down In A Mirror: A Second Tribute To Jandek, 2005
 7th Floor Christmas – Erich Overhultz, 2005
 The New Sell Out, 2012
 Saucerland – Simply Saucer, 2016
 Valentino's Pirates – Dave Rave Conspiracy (aka Dave Rave Group), 2019

Bibliography
 Music Hound Rock: The Essential Album Guide (Visible Ink/Omnibus, 1996, 1999, contributor)
 Music Hound Country: The Essential Album Guide (Visible Ink/Omnibus, 1997, contributor)
 Music Hound R & B: The Essential Album Guide (Visible Ink/Omnibus, 1998, contributor)
 Music Hound Folk: The Essential Album Guide (Visible Ink/Omnibus, 1998, contributor)
 Music Hound Lounge: The Essential Album Guide to Martini Music and Easy Listening (Visible Ink/Omnibus, 1998, contributor)
 On A Cold Road: Tales of Adventure in Canadian Rock by Dave Bidini (McClelland & Stewart, 1998, interview subject)
 Music Hound Swing: The Essential Album Guide (Visible Ink/Omnibus, 1999, contributor)
 Music Hound World: The Essential Album Guide (Visible Ink/Omnibus, 2000, contributor)
 Encounters with Bob Dylan: If You See Him, Say Hello (Humble Press, 2000, contributor)
 Paul McCartney: I Saw Him Standing There (Billboard Books, 2000, contributor)
 Bubblegum Music is the Naked Truth: The Dark History of Prepubescent Pop, from the Banana Splits to Britney Spears (Feral House, 2001, contributor)
 The Beach Boys’ Pet Sounds: The Greatest Album of the Twentieth Century (Helter Skelter, 2001, contributor)
 Lost In The Grooves (Routledge, 2005, contributor)
 T.V. A-Go-Go: Rock on T.V. from American Bandstand to American Idol (Chicago Review Press, 2005, contributor)
 The Little Black Book of Music (Cassell Illustrated, 2007, contributor)
 The Top 100 Canadian Albums (Goose Lane Editions, 2007, contributor)
 Treat Me Like Dirt: An Oral History of Punk in Toronto and Beyond, 1977-1981 (Bongo Beat Books/ECW Press, 2009, 2011, editor, interview subject)
 The Mammoth Book of Bob Dylan (Constable & Robinson/Running Press, 2011, contributor)
 Perfect Youth: The Birth of Canadian Punk (ECW Press, 2012, interview subject)
 The Canadian Pop Music Encyclopedia Volumes 1 and 2 (Bullseye Canada, 2012, contributor)
 A Lennon Pastiche: Expressions from Fans of John Lennon (PANGEA Publishing, 2013, contributor)
 50 Licks: Myths and Stories from Half a Century of the Rolling Stones (Bloomsbury Publishing, 2013, contributor)
 A Tribute To The Forgotten Rebels (ePub Bud, 2013, contributor)
 The Mammoth Book of The Rolling Stones (Constable & Robinson/Running Press, 2013, contributor)
 It Was Fifty Years Ago Today: The Beatles Invade America and Hollywood (Otherworld Cottage Industries, 2014, interview subject)
 Turn Up The Radio!  Rock, Pop, and Roll in Los Angeles 1956-1972 (Santa Monica Press, 2014, contributor)
 Gods Of The Hammer: The Teenage Head Story (Coach House Books, 2014, interview subject)
 Neil Young: Heart of Gold (Backbeat Books, 2015, contributor)
 Heavy Metalloid Music: The Story of Simply Saucer (Eternal Cavalier Press, 2016, interview subject)
 1967: A Complete Rock Music History of the Summer of Love (Sterling Publishing, 2017, contributor)
 Inside Cave Hollywood: Music InnerViews and InterViews Collection, Vol. 1 (Cave Hollywood, 2017, contributor)
 Dreamer: The Making of Dennis Wilson's 'Pacific Ocean Blue' (Jetfighter, 2017, interview subject)
 The Doors: Summer's Gone (Otherworld Cottage Industries, 2018, contributor)
 The Story Of The Band: From Big Pink to The Last Waltz (Sterling Publishing, 2018, contributor)
 Docs That Rock, Music That Matters (Otherworld Cottage Industries, 2020, contributor)
 Domenic Troiano: His Life And Music (FriesenPress, 2021, interview subject)
 Jimi Hendrix: Voodoo Child (Sterling Publishing, 2021, interview subject)

Selected articles
 The Blacklisted Journalist
 In Music We Trust
 New York Waste
 Medleyville
 Go Metric
 The Rock and Roll Report
 PopDiggers

Filmography
 Jandek on Corwood'', 2004
 The Last Pogo Jumps Again, 2013
 Records, 2021

References

1955 births
Living people
Canadian male singer-songwriters
Canadian singer-songwriters
Musicians from Toronto